The Kings Highway station is an express station on the BMT Brighton Line of the New York City Subway. It is located at Kings Highway between East 15th and East 16th Streets on the border of Midwood and Sheepshead Bay neighborhoods of Brooklyn. The station is served by the Q train at all times and by the B train on weekdays only.

History 
On January 10, 1951, a new entrance to Quentin Road and East 16th Street was opened with a modern station house. The $250,000 project took approximately a year to be completed.

This station underwent reconstruction from 2009–2011, which included installation of ADA-accessible elevators to the full-time fare control area and rebuilding of the platforms and station houses. A temporary platform was used to provide service that would normally stop at the closed platform.

Station layout

This station has four tracks and two island platforms. The two platforms are offset from each other, with the northbound platform located roughly  further north than the southbound platform. It has three fare control areas at street level—two to Kings Highway/East 16th Street and one to Quentin Road/East 16th Street. The two mezzanines at Kings Highway, located directly underneath the subway embankment, were constructed in the original BMT format, but fully renovated in the 1980s, during which two identical sets of porcelain enamel artwork (Kings Highway Hieroglyphs by Rhoda Andors) were installed, one set in each mezzanine.

South of Kings Highway are a series of switches that allow trains to switch from the local tracks to the express ones, and vice versa. During the signal replacement, a new signal electrical tower was installed over the express tracks at the south end of the station.

Exits
The entrance on the south side is normally the full-time entrance/exit, containing a turnstile bank, token booth, two staircases to each platform, and one exit-only turnstile from the Coney Island-bound platform. The one on the north is HEET access only, containing three turnstiles, a staircase to each platform and its MetroCard Vending Machines were installed on the sidewalk.

The part-time Quentin Road station house, located to the east of the embankment, has a turnstile bank, part-time booth, and two staircases to each platform. It was built after the station's opening to accommodate growing passenger flow as evidenced by its newer-style tiling and signage. Platform extensions are clearly present at the north end of the station. It has a token booth, turnstile bank, and two staircases to each platform with the southbound side requiring a short walk.

Gallery

References

External links 

 
 Station Reporter — B Train
 Station Reporter — Q Train
 Artwork: "Kings Highway Hieroglyphics", Rhoda Yohai Andors (1987)
 MTA's Arts For Transit — Kings Highway (BMT Brighton Line)
 The Subway Nut — Kings Highway Pictures
 Kings Highway entrance — south side from Google Maps Street View
 Kings Highway entrance — north side from Google Maps Street View
 Quentin Road entrance from Google Maps Street View
 Platforms from Google Maps Street View

BMT Brighton Line stations
New York City Subway stations in Brooklyn
Railway stations in the United States opened in 1878
Railway stations in the United States opened in 1907
1878 establishments in New York (state)
Railway stations with vitreous enamel panels
Midwood, Brooklyn
Sheepshead Bay, Brooklyn